Transplants is the debut studio album by the American punk rock/hip hop band Transplants. It was released on October 22, 2002 via Hellcat Records. Audio production of the twelve-track record was handled by Tim Armstrong and Dave Carlock. Rancid's Matt Freeman and Lars Frederiksen, The Slackers' Vic Ruggiero, The Distillers' Brody Dalle, AFI's Davey Havok, Funkdoobiest's Son Doobie, The Nerve Agents' Eric Ozenne, and Skarhead's Danny Diablo made their appearances on the album as additional musicians and vocalists.

The album peaked at #96 on the Billboard 200 and #1 on the Independent Albums. Its lead single, "Diamonds and Guns", peaked at #19 on the Alternative Songs, #27 on the UK Singles Chart, and was most played as background music in older Garnier Fructis TV commercials. The second single of the album, "D.J. D.J." peaked at #49 on the UK Singles Chart. Both its singles are featured in Paul Hunter's 2003 film Bulletproof Monk. The song "California Babylon" is included in the 2003 video game Tony Hawk's Underground.

Track listing

Personnel

 Tim Armstrong - vocals (tracks: 2–4, 6-10, 12), guitar, bass (tracks: 4–5, 7–9, 12), synthesizer (tracks: 1, 5), percussion (track 6, 10), loops, producer, mixing
 Rob "Skinhead Rob" Aston - vocals (tracks: 1-11), scratches (tracks: 3–4, 11)
 Travis Barker - drums 
 Eric Ozenne - vocals (track 1)
 Son Doobie - vocals (track 4)
 Davey Havok - vocals (track 5)
 Brody Dalle - vocals (tracks: 2, 7)
 Danny Diablo - vocals (track 11)
 Dave Carlock - backing vocals (tracks: 3–4, 6), guitar (track 11), bass (tracks: 1, 6, 11), piano (track 4), synthesizer (tracks: 1–3, 6–7, 9, 11-12), producer, mixing
 Lars Frederiksen - backing vocals (track 10)
 Matt Freeman - bass (track 2)
 Victor Ruggiero - piano (tracks: 9-10, 12), Hammond B-3 organ (tracks: 2, 6–7, 9, 10, 12)
 Gene Grimaldi - mastering
 Estavan Oriol - photography, artwork & design
 Mark Machado - artwork & design
 Eklipsone - artwork & design

Charts 

Album

Singles

References

External links 

2002 debut albums
Hellcat Records albums
Transplants (band) albums